Kids' WB (stylized as Kids' WB!) is an Australian children's television programme which aired on the Nine Network from 16 September 2006 to 29 November 2019. It is based on the US television block of the same name with the addition of hosted content, which was absent in its American counterpart. It was originally hosted by Georgia Sinclair and Shura Taft. The show is a television block which aired on weekend mornings and weekday afternoons, mainly consisting of cartoons and locally hosted variety-style segments, filmed at GTV-9 in Melbourne, itself owned by the Nine Network, and occasionally on location at Warner Bros. Movie World in Queensland. The show would not air over December and January. As of 2013, Kids' WB aired exclusively on 9Go!. Its final presenters were Lauren Phillips and Andy Sunderland.

Hosts

  

Notes
 Tayla Johnston and Andy Sunderland joined the show as roving reporters on 17 February 2018.

History
On 20 August 2011, Kids' WB celebrated its 200th episode of the Saturday show on Nine.

In July 2013, the hosts travelled to Los Angeles, broadcasting from Warner Bros. studios in Burbank, California.

Kids' WB celebrated the 75th anniversary of Batman on 23 July 2014 with a Batman-themed day.

2015 saw the show celebrate its 10th anniversary year, with the hosts visiting Los Angeles in July to represent Australia in the international Razor Cart Championships. The 2015 season also featured classic Looney Tunes shorts which hadn't aired on Nine since 1992.

On 21 November 2019, TV Tonight reported that Kids' WB had been axed and that production on the series would conclude within two weeks. It was stated that the cancellation of the series was due to the expiry of the Nine Network's long-running output deal with Warner Bros. The final episode aired on 29 November 2019, ending the show's 13-year run.

Time slot
Kids' WB premiered on 16 September 2006, in the time slot of Saturdays from 7:30 am to 10:00 am on Nine.

On 30 May 2009, the program moved to the later time slot of 9:00 am to 11:30 am to make way for Weekend Today.

With the launch of Nine's new multi-channel GO! (later renamed 9Go!) in 2009, extra Kids' WB content was added. From 9 August 2009, the show aired on Sundays from 7:00 am to 11:00 am as Kids' WB Sunday and Saturdays from 7:00 am to 9:00 am as Kids' WB Early Shift Saturday, before the main show on Nine.

On 6 March 2010, the main Kids’ WB Saturday show on Nine was moved to the later time slot of 10:00 am to 12:30 pm upon the premiere of Saturday Kerri-Anne. The Early Shift on GO! was extended to air from 7:00 am to 10:00 am.

Kids’ WB again moved to a later time slot on 30 April 2011, airing from 11:00 am to 1:30 pm, with Saturday Kerri-Anne being extended. The Early Shift on GO! was again extended to 7:00 am to 11:00 am, now branded as only Kids’ WB Saturday, to match Kids’ WB Sunday, also airing from 7:00 am to 11:00 am. This followed Kids’ WB Weekdays launching on 7 March 2011, airing from 4:00 pm to 4:30 pm weekday afternoons on GO!

Upon the 2013 return of Kids’ WB on 16 February 2013, the main show on Nine was dropped, with the show now airing exclusively on GO!, on Saturdays and Sundays from 7:00 am to 11:00 am, and weekday afternoons from 4:00 pm to 5:00 pm, with the weekday show being extended. It remained in these slots until its conclusion in 2019.

See also

 List of longest-running Australian television series

References

Nine Network
9Go! original programming
Television programming blocks in Australia
Australian children's television series
2006 Australian television series debuts
2019 Australian television series endings
Television shows set in Melbourne
 
Television shows set in Gold Coast, Queensland